Vermont was a Milwaukee, Wisconsin-based indie rock band and collaboration between Davey von Bohlen and Dan Didier of The Promise Ring and Chris Roseanau of Pele. The band released two albums on Kindercore Records and broke up in 2001, before von Bohlen founding the band Maritime.

Discography
Living Together (1999 - Kindercore)
Mark Mallman and Vermont (2001 - Guilt Ridden Pop)
Calling Albany (2002 - Kindercore)

References

Indie rock musical groups from Wisconsin
Musical groups established in 1999
Musical groups disestablished in 2002
American musical trios
1999 establishments in Wisconsin